Harold Victor Stirling (7 April 1904 – 23 July 1968) was an Australian politician.

He was born at Carisbrook to dairy farmer Henry Stirling and Phillis Walker. He attended local schools and worked for the State Electricity Commission before assuming control of the family property at Mead in 1929. Around this time he married Philippa Kate "Kitty" Grills, with whom he had three  sons and a daughter. Prominent in local agricultural circles, he served on Cohuna Shire Council from 1944 to 1959 (president 1949–50) and was national president of the Primary Producers' Union from 1949 to 1952. In 1952 he was elected to the Victorian Legislative Assembly as the Country Party member for Swan Hill. He served until his death at Kerang in 1968.

References

1904 births
1968 deaths
National Party of Australia members of the Parliament of Victoria
Members of the Victorian Legislative Assembly
20th-century Australian politicians